16 Hudson is a Canadian animated series. It is developed by Big Bad Boo based on the fifteen-episode miniseries Lili & Lola from 2015.

It has been broadcast by TVOKids since August 21, 2018, and Knowledge Kids since September 3, 2018.

The first and second seasons each have 39 episodes which are each 7 minutes long. A series of five ER (emergency room) shorts put out as PSAs in response to COVID-19.

After the 2nd season in 2020, a 3rd season was scheduled for the summer of 2022. It will contain 21 episodes, each approximately seven minutes long, plus five more (total 10) ER shorts. This brings the total episodes in the franchise to  episodes.

episodes

season 0
(Lili and Lola prequel episodes)
s0e1 "The Light Bulb"
s0e2 "Small"
s0e3 "Lili Picasso"
s0e4 "Lili Detective"
s0e5 "Norooz"
s0e6 "The Four Season"
s0e7 "The Music Box"
s0e8 "Thanks But No Thanks"
s0e9 "Baba's Ice Cream Part 1"
s0e10 "Baba's Ice Cream Part 2"
s0e11 "Lola's Fancy Dress"
s0e12 "Movie Night"
s0e13 "Story Time"
s0e14 "Trouble in Pardis"
s0e15 "Snow Day"

season 1

Thiryty-nine episodes aired from 2018-2019
s1e1 "?" August 18, 2018
s1e2 "Huggle Day" August 23, 2018
s1e3 "2A" August 28, 2018
s1e4 "Lili's Skating Badge" August 30, 2018
s1e5 "Super Rainbow Macaron" September 4, 2018
s1e6 "Toothbrush 3" September 7, 2018
s1e7
s1e8
s1e9
s1e10
s1e11
s1e12
s1e13
s1e14
s1e15
s1e16
s1e17
s1e18
s1e19
s1e20
s1e21
s1e22
s1e23
s1e24
s1e25
s1e26
s1e27
s1e28
s1e29
s1e30
s1e31
s1e32
s1e33
s1e34
s1e35
s1e36
s1e37
s1e38
s1e39

"Home Remedies" and "The Feather" may be part of this, or possibly are among the four missing episode titles in season 2 below.

season 2

Thirty-nine episodes aired from 2020 to 2021:

s2e1 "The Blob that Everyone Ate" September 8, 2020
s2e2 "Lacrosse Purposes" September 10, 2020
s2e3 "Picture Perfect" September 15, 2020
s2e4 "Roof of the Brave" September 17, 2020
s2e5 "Mezopitzonia" September 22, 2022 (Sep21 mislist)
s2e6 "Tickle Tornado" September 24, 2020 (ep7 mistlist per code)
s2e7 "Sam's Singing Smiles" September 29, 2020 (ep11 mislist per code)
s2e8 "Jazzbot" October 1, 2020 (Sep24 mislist)
s2e9 "Operation Nanni" October 6, 2020 (Sep25 mislist)
s2e10 "Friendsgiving" October 8, 2020 (Sep28 mislist)
s2e11 "Luc's Very Bad Day" October 13, 2020 (Sept29 mislist)
s2e12 "Bird's Eye View" October 15, 2020 (Sep30 mislist)
s2e13 "Fair Game" October 20, 2020 (Oct1 mislist)
s2e14 "Art Smart" October 22, 2020 (Oct2 mislist)
s2e15 "Cool Eddie" October 27, 2020 (Oct5 mislist)
s2e16 "Unfair Fun Fair" October 29, 2020 (Oct6 mislist)
s2e17 "Thanks, But No Pranks" November 3, 2020 (Oct7 mislist)
s2e18 "" November 5, 2020
s2e19 "Cool to Be Kind" November 10, 2020
s2e20 "Stone Soup" November 12, 2020
s2e21 "Social Butterfly" November 17, 2020
s2e22 "The Jig Is Up" November 19, 2020 (Oct14 mislist)
s2e23 "" November 24, 2020
s2e24 "The Pit Crew" November 26, 2020
s2e25 "Happy Tavalod to You" December 1, 2020 (Oct19 mislist)
s2e26 "Amala's No Talent Show" December 3, 2020
s2e?? "A 16 Hudson Christmas Tree" December 8, 2020
s2e27 "The Tell Tale Robot" December 10, 2020
s2e28 "The Great Race" December 15, 2020
s2e29 "Squircle Pancakes" December 17, 2020
s2e30 "Ritika T Butterfly" December 22, 2020
s2e31 "Perky Pup" January 5, 2021
s2e32 "Dirty Dishes" January 7, 2021
s2e33 "Seaweed Sam" January 12, 2021
s2e34 "Welcome" January 24, 2021
s2e35 ""
s2e36 ""
s2e37 "Luc's Harvest Feast"
s2e38 "The Buddy Zone"
s2e39 "Winter is the Best"

season 3

s3e1 "The Bloopians Are Coming!" July 11, 2022
s3e2 "Nye-Nye Paints It Out" July 18, 2022
s3e3 "Home Improvements"
s3e4 "
s3e5 "
s3e6 "Out of Step"
s3e7 "
s3e8 "
s3e9 "Lili's Big Adventure"
s3e10 "Hands"
s3e11 "Gathering Storm"
s3e12 "
s3e13 "
s3e14 "
s3e15 "
s3e16 "
s3e17 "
s3e18 "
s3e19 "
s3e20 "
s3e21 "?" (finale)

ER shorts

The first five were batched in April 2020 while another five are due in summer 2020 bringing the total to ten.

Lola's Sneezing School
Washing Hands
Coronavirus Game Show
Social Distancing
Luc's New Hour

References

External links
Official website

2010s Canadian animated television series
2010s preschool education television series
2018 Canadian television series debuts
TVO original programming
Canadian children's animated television series
Canadian preschool education television series
Animated preschool education television series
Animated television series about children
Knowledge Network original programming